was a town located in Hata District, Kōchi Prefecture, Japan.

As of 2003, the town had an estimated population of 4,033 and a density of 53.18 persons per km². The total area was 75.84 km².

On March 20, 2006, Saga, along with the town of Ōgata (also from Hata District), was merged to create the town of Kuroshio and no longer exists as an independent municipality.

External links
 Official website of Kuroshio 

Dissolved municipalities of Kōchi Prefecture
Kuroshio, Kōchi